The Dominican Summer Pirates are a minor league baseball team in the Dominican Summer League. The team, also known as the DSL Pirates, plays in the Boca Chica, Dominican Republic, as a member of the Boca Chica North Division and are affiliated with the Pittsburgh Pirates.

History
Past players include Aramis Ramírez, José Guillén and Ronny Paulino. The club was known as the Dominican Summer League Pirates 1, or DSL Pirates 1, between 2012 and 2013, when the Venezuelan Summer Pirates were relocated to the Dominican Republic to become the Dominican Summer League Pirates 2. In 2014, the Pirates returned to fielding one DSL team, and the team became known once again as the DSL Pirates.

Roster

Season-by-season

References

External links 
MiLB.com team page
Baseball Reference current team page
DSL Pirates on SABR Minor Leagues Database

Baseball teams in the Dominican Republic
Pittsburgh Pirates minor league affiliates
Dominican Summer League teams